Huene may refer to:

 Oswald von Hoyningen-Huene (1885-1963), a German diplomat
 Friedrich von Huene (1875–1969), a German paleontologist
George Hoyningen-Huene (1900–1968), a seminal fashion photographer of the 1920s and 1930s
Paul Hoyningen-Huene (born 1946), a German philosopher
 Huenes Marcelo Lemos (born 1981), a Brazilian football player